The Belmont Gold Cup Stakes is a Grade II American Thoroughbred horse race for horses aged four years old and older held over a distance of two miles on the turf scheduled annually in early June at Belmont Park in Elmont, New York.  The event currently carries a purse of $400,000.

History

The race was inaugurated in 2014 with a stakes purse of $200,000.

In 2017 the event was classified as Grade III and was reclassified as Grade II for 2018.

The event is longest graded event in North America and attracts many entrants from Europe where long distance staying races on the turf are more numerous.

In 2020 due to the COVID-19 pandemic in the United States, NYRA did not schedule the event in their updated and shortened spring-summer meeting.

Records
Speed record: 
3:16.78 - Call To Mind (2018)

Largest margin of victory:
  length  - Baron Samedi (GB) (2021)

Most wins by a jockey:
 2 – John R. Velazquez (2014, 2021)

Most wins by a trainer:
 No trainer has won this race more than once.

Most wins by an owner:
 No owner has won this race more than once.

Winners

See also
 List of American and Canadian Graded races

References

Graded stakes races in the United States
Recurring sporting events established in 2014
Horse races in New York (state)
Open long distance horse races
2014 establishments in New York (state)
Grade 2 stakes races in the United States
Turf races in the United States